The Biographical Memoirs of the National Academy of Sciences has been published by the United States National Academy of Sciences since 1877 and presents biographies of selected members. This series of annual volumes (often abbreviated BMNAS), and the analogous British Biographical Memoirs of Fellows of the Royal Society, are "important examples of biographical serials".

The entries in the series are written by an academy member familiar with the subject's work and are written after the subject's death. Each entry includes a biography, photo, and a copy of the subject's signature. Recent biographies from this series have also been made available online.

References

External links 
 

United States National Academy of Sciences
History of science journals
Biography journals
Annual journals
Academic journals published by learned and professional societies
Publications established in 1877
English-language journals
1877 establishments in the United States